Manushulu Mamathalu is a 1965 Indian Telugu-language drama film produced by A. V. Subba Rao under the Prasad Art Productions banner and directed by K. Pratyagatma. It stars Akkineni Nageswara Rao, Nissankara Savitri Guruvaiah and Jayalalithaa, with music composed by T. Chalapathi Rao. T. Rama Rao worked as associate director for this film. This picture is also remembered to be Jayalalithaa's Telugu debut as a leading actress (having previously worked as a child artiste in mostly song sequences). This was the first Telugu film to ever receive an A certificate from the Censor Board.

Plot 
Rajarao is a rich man and has a daughter Radha. Radha's mother has died during her childhood and her father has looked after her ever since. At that time, Rajarao allows his sister Kanakamma and her son Venu to stay in his house. Venu's father has died in the Godavari floods. Venu has witnessed this sad incident and dreams of becoming an engineer to curb such calamities by constructing dams. He studies very hard and shares a good friendship with Radha since childhood. While Venu considers Radha to be a good friend, Radha falls in love with Venu after growing up. One fine day, Radha proposes to Venu, but the latter rejects her politely saying he always looked at her as a friend and also says that he would never want to marry in life, but settle down as a good engineer and work for the nation. A sensible Radha understands his ambition and respects his decision. Meanwhile, Rajarao has a nephew Seshu who is a spoiled brat. He has an affair with a prostitute Vani and plans to marry Radha for the sake of her property. But Radha hates him.

Rajarao's friend Gopala Rao is a chief engineer who lives in the city and has a daughter Indira. His brother's son Bhaskar is a B.A. Graduate, but idle in life. On a friendly word, Rajarao gets Radha married to Bhaskar. At the same time, Venu gets a seat in an engineering college and arrives in the town. Gopala Rao offers Venu to study in the college by staying at his place. The jovial Indira falls for Venu and tries to gain his attention in various ways. Venu realises her intentions and tries to stay away. The more he distances himself from her, the more she tries. Gopala Rao also wants Venu to become his son-in-law. Meanwhile, Seshu plans to break Radha's marriage out of anger that he couldn't marry her. He takes the help of Vani and they both trap Bhaskar. When Venu realises that Radha's life is in trouble, he arrives on the scene and repairs the broken relationship between Bhaskar and Radha with the help of Indira.

Cast 
Akkineni Nageswara Rao as Venu
Savitri as Radha
Jayalalithaa as Indira
Jaggayya as Bhaskar
Gummadi as Raja Rao
Ramana Reddy as Gopalam
Prabhakar Reddy as Seshu
Rajasree as Vani
Hemalatha

Soundtrack 
The music was composed by T. Chalapathi Rao.

Accolades 
The film won the National Film Award for Best Feature Film in Telugu.

References

External links 
 

1960s Telugu-language films
1965 films
Films directed by Kotayya Pratyagatma
Films scored by T. Chalapathi Rao